Tyinkrysset is a village in Vang Municipality in Innlandet county, Norway. The village is located in the Filefjell mountains, just a short distance south of the lake Tyin.

The European route E16 highway passes through Tyinkrysset, connecting Innlandet county with Lærdal Municipality to the west. Also, the Norwegian County Road 53 heads north from the village towards Årdal Municipality. Many mountain-climbers enjoy this area as it has few inhabitants and has many mountain climbing and hiking opportunities. There is a hotel in the village as well as many holiday cottages.

References

Vang, Innlandet
Villages in Innlandet